Varnam in Iran may refer to:
 Varnam, Neka
 Varnam-e Bala, Sari County
 Varnam-e Pain, Sari County